Xyster may refer to:

 Xyster Framework, an open-source application framework for the computer scripting language PHP
 Zapteryx xyster, the southern banded guitarfish